Friedrich Otto Rudolf Sturm (6 January 1841 – 12 April 1919) was a German mathematician. His Ph.D. advisor was Heinrich Eduard Schroeter, and Otto Toeplitz was one of his Ph.D. students. His best ever proposal type claim is commonly known as "Sturm's Theorem" based on finding the complex imaginary roots of an infinite arbitrary-integer series.

References

Works

External links
 
Rudolf Sturm by Walter Ludwig

1841 births
1919 deaths
19th-century German mathematicians
20th-century German mathematicians
Geometers
Scientists from Wrocław
People from the Province of Silesia